The 1998 Edmonton Eskimos, coached by Kay Stephenson, finished in 3rd place in the West Division with a 9–9 record. They were defeated in the West Final by the Calgary Stampeders.

Contents 
 1 Offseason
 1.1 CFL Draft
 2 Preseason
 2.1 Schedule
 3 Regular season
 3.1 Season standings
 3.2 Season schedule
 3.3 1999 CFL All-Stars
 3.4 Offence
 3.5 Western All-Star Selections
 3.6 Offence
 3.7 Defence
 4 Playoffs

Offseason

CFL Draft

Preseason

Schedule

Regular season

Season standings 
Team GP W L T PF PA Pts BC Lions 18 13 5 0 429 373 26 Calgary Stampeders 18 12 6 0 503 393 24 Edmonton Eskimos 18 6 12 0 459 502 12 Saskatchewan Roughriders 18 3 15 0 370 592 6

Season schedule 
Week Date Opponent Score Result Attendance Record Streak 1 July 9 vs British Columbia Lions 25–13 L 33404 0–1 L1 2 July 16 vs Saskatchewan Roughriders 39–6 W 32113 1–1 W1 3 July 22 at Calgary Stampeders 41–27 L 31246 1–2 L1 4 July 29 at Hamilton Tiger-Cats 54–8 L 16815 1–3 L2 5 August 6 vs Montreal Alouettes 20–13 L 33154 1–4 L3 6 August 13 at Winnipeg Blue Bombers 56–26 W 22454 2–4 W2 7 August 20 at Saskatchewan Roughriders 29–27 L 16544 2–5 L1 8 August 27 vs Hamilton Tiger-Cats 30–23 OTL 34180 2–6 L2 9 September 6 at Calgary Stampeders 33–30 OTW 37611 3–6 W1 10 September 10 vs Calgary Stampeders 38–13 L 52458 3–7 L1 11 September 17 at Saskatchewan Roughriders 41–38 W 18321 4–7 W1 12 September 26 vs Toronto Argonauts 20–16 L 31085 4–8 L1 13 October 3 vs Winnipeg Blue Bombers 27–19 L 27211 4–9 L2 14 October 11 at British Columbia Lions 26–20 W 26177 5–9 W1 15 October 17 vs British Columbia Lions 21–13 OTL 30713 5–10 L1 16 October 23 at Montreal Alouettes 36–33 L 19461 5–11 L2 17 October 30 vs Saskatchewan Roughriders 34–21 W 33850 6–11 W1 18 November 6 at Toronto Argonauts 20–15 L 19460 6–12 L1
Awards and records

1999 CFL All-Stars

Offence 
 OG – Leo Groenewegen

Western All-Star Selections

Offence 
 OG – Leo Groenewegen, Edmonton Eskimos
 OG – Val St. Germain, Edmonton Eskimos

Defence 
 DT – Doug Petersen, Edmonton Eskimos
 LB – Terry Ray, Edmonton Eskimos

Playoffs 
Team Q1 Q2 Q3 Q4 Tot Calgary Stampeders 7 14 6 3 30 Edmonton Eskimos 0 3 7 7 17

Edmonton Elks seasons
1998 in Alberta
1998 Canadian Football League season by team